Tiger of Sabrodt is the name given to a wolf shot in Lusatia in 1904; the last free-living wolf to be shot within the current borders of Germany prior to 1945.

The wolf was shot near the town of Hoyerswerda (then part of Silesia) on 27 February 1904, by a forester who received a 100 mark bounty for killing it.

The wolf had been preying on livestock; the locals referred to it as a raubsüchtiges Ungetüm (ravening monster). There had been no wolves in the area for a long time, so an escaped circus animal was suspected, and it was given the name "Tiger of Sabrodt" after the village of Sabrodt (part of Elsterheide) where it first appeared.

The carcass was mounted and remains on display in the museum in Castle Hoyerswerda. In the meantime wolves have returned to Lusatia, successfully breeding there in 2009.

The wolf is the subject of a song titled "Tiger of Sabrod" on the 2007 album Lupus Dei by German Power metal band Powerwolf.

References

Lusatia
Hunting in Germany
1904 animal deaths
Individual wolves
Individual animals in Germany
Individual wild animals